Anyar Pratama Football Club (simply known as APFC or Anyar Pratama) is an Indonesian football club based in Anyer, Serang Regency, Banten. They currently compete in the Liga 3.

References

External links

Serang Regency
Sport in Banten
Football clubs in Indonesia
Football clubs in Banten
Association football clubs established in 1998
1998 establishments in Indonesia